Acartauchenius is a genus of  dwarf spiders that was first described by Eugène Louis Simon in 1884.

Species
 it contains seventeen species:
Acartauchenius asiaticus (Tanasevitch, 1989) – Turkmenistan
Acartauchenius bedeli (Simon, 1884) – Algeria
Acartauchenius derisor (Simon, 1918) – France
Acartauchenius desertus (Tanasevitch, 1993) – Kazakhstan
Acartauchenius hamulifer (Denis, 1937) – Algeria
Acartauchenius himalayensis Tanasevitch, 2011 – Pakistan
Acartauchenius insigniceps (Simon, 1894) – Morocco, Algeria, Tunisia
Acartauchenius leprieuri (O. Pickard-Cambridge, 1875) – Algeria
Acartauchenius minor (Millidge, 1979) – Italy
Acartauchenius monoceros (Tanasevitch, 1989) – Uzbekistan
Acartauchenius mutabilis (Denis, 1967) – Morocco, Algeria, Tunisia
Acartauchenius orientalis Wunderlich, 1995 – Mongolia
Acartauchenius planiceps Bosmans, 2002 – Algeria
Acartauchenius praeceps Bosmans, 2002 – Algeria
Acartauchenius sardiniensis Wunderlich, 1995 – Sardinia
Acartauchenius scurrilis (O. Pickard-Cambridge, 1873) (type) – Europe, Turkey, Russia (Europe to South Siberia), Central Asia
Acartauchenius simoni Bosmans, 2002 – Algeria

See also
 List of Linyphiidae species

References

Araneomorphae genera
Linyphiidae
Spiders of Africa
Spiders of Asia